Jong In-chol (born 20 October 1957) is a North Korean judoka. He competed in the men's middleweight event at the 1976 Summer Olympics.

References

1957 births
Living people
North Korean male judoka
Olympic judoka of North Korea
Judoka at the 1976 Summer Olympics
Place of birth missing (living people)